Anno Domini High Definition is the fourth full-length studio album by Polish progressive rock band Riverside and also the first full-length Riverside album that is separate from the Reality Dream suite. The album was released in Poland on Friday 19 June 2009 through Mystic Production and was released in Europe on 6 July 2009 through InsideOut. The album was a commercial success in the band's home country of Poland where it reached the top of the official album chart. The art design and direction was, once again, handled by Travis Smith.

A special edition of the album includes a bonus DVD, filmed during a December 2008 live performance at Amsterdam's Paradiso club.

Track listing

Special edition bonus DVD 'Live in Amsterdam 2008'
 "Volte-Face" - 8:50
 "I Turned You Down" - 5:10
 "Reality Dream III" - 5:16
 "Beyond The Eyelids" - 7:23
 "Conceiving You" - 4:18
 "Ultimate Trip" - 5:07
 "02 Panic Room" - 4:43

Personnel

Riverside
Mariusz Duda – vocals, bass, acoustic guitar
Piotr Grudziński – guitar
Michał Łapaj – keyboards, theremin
Piotr Kozieradzki – drums

Guest musicians
Rafał Gańko – trumpet on "Egoist Hedonist"
Karol Gołowacz – saxophone on "Egoist Hedonist"
Adam Kłosiński – trombone on "Egoist Hedonist"

Production
Produced by Riverside and Szymon Chech
Recorded and mixed by Szymon Chech
Mastered by Grzegorz Piwkowski

Charts

References

2009 albums
Concept albums
Riverside (band) albums
Inside Out Music albums
Mystic Production albums
Albums with cover art by Travis Smith (artist)